The 2008–09 OK Liga was the 40th season of the top-tier league of rink hockey in Spain.

Barcelona Sorli Discau finished the league as champion.

Competition format
Sixteen teams joined the league.

The eight first teams at the end of the regular season qualified for the playoffs while the three last teams were relegated to Primera División.

Regular season

Playoffs
Quarterfinals were played with a best-of-three format, while semifinals and final were played with a best-of-five series.

Seeded teams played games 1 and 3 of the quarterfinals and 1, 2 and 5 of semifinals and finals at home.

Final standings

Copa del Rey

The 2009 Copa del Rey was the 66th edition of the Spanish men's roller hockey cup. It was played in A Coruña between the eight first qualified teams after the first half of the season.

Roncato Vic won its 2nd cup.

References

External links
Real Federación Española de Patinaje

OK Liga seasons
2008 in roller hockey
2009 in roller hockey
2008 in Spanish sport
2009 in Spanish sport